Golgulsa (literally "Stone Buddha Temple") is located 20 km east of the ancient Silla Dynasty capital city of Gyeongju in Southeastern Korea.  In the Golgulsa temple area can be found the oldest historical Buddhist ruins on Mt. Hamwol and the only cave temple in Korea.

History 
Golgulsa Temple (Korean: 골굴사, Chinese: 骨窟寺, Pronounced “Gol-gul-sa”) was established on Mt. Hamwolsan, along with Girimsa, by Master Gwangyu  and his retinue who came to Korea from India about 1,500 years ago. Golgulsa Temple is the oldest grotto temple in Korea, emulating those in India.

According to a painting of Jeong Seon (pen name; Gyeomjae) during the mid-Joseon era, Golgulsa Temple was established by constructing a wooden antechapel in front of several stone grottoes and covering it with tiles. The temple was left in ruins after it was burnt down in the mid to late Joseon era. Then about 70 years ago, the Bak clan of Gyeongju moved there and began reconstruction. The temple was sold to an individual in 1989, but Ven. Seol Jeogun, then head of Girimsa, eventually purchased it. Currently Golgulsa is registered as a branch temple of Bulguksa, the head temple of the 11th religious district, Jogye Order of Korean Buddhism.

The seated rock-carved Buddha (Treasure No. 581),  the main Buddha of Golgulsa Temple, faces the underwater tomb of King Munmu, and around the Buddha are many grotto Dharma halls, such as Avalokitesvara Grotto, Ksitigarbha Grotto, Medicine Buddha Grotto, Arhat Grotto and Guardian Deities Hall. There are also relics of traditional folk religions such as rocks carved into phalluses and vaginas.

Recently ex-Master Monk of Kirimsa (Kirim Temple), Seol Jeog-un constructed a road while simultaneously renovating the Golgulsa Temple.

Cultural properties  

The seated rock-carved Buddha of Golgulsa Temple was carved into the limestone cliff in the 9th century during the United Silla Dynasty; it is the main Buddha of the temple. The statue gazes toward the Sea of Japan with a gentle smile and beautiful nimbus in which luxurious lotuses and flames are carved.

Nearer the ocean, about 10 kilometers (6 miles) from Golgulsa Temple, are the Gameunsa Temple ruins and the underwater tomb of King Munmu. Located southeast of the seated rock-carved Buddha, the ruins of Gameunsa Temple consist of two Three-Story Stone Pagodas (National Treasure No. 112). Standing 13.4 meters (44 feet) high, the two pagodas are aesthetically pleasing and well balanced; they are regarded as the standard of Korean stone pagodas.

Southeast of the ruins lies a small rocky island rising from the ocean; this is the underwater tomb of King Munmu and it is a symbol of King Munmu's will to fend off the invading Japanese even in death. The tomb was established on this rock which is about 200 meters (656 feet) in circumference. Two waterways form a cross shape that divides the island, one running east to west and the other north to south. In a sunken area in the center is a small pool: that is his tomb.

The Breath of Seon 
Sunmudo training is composed of:  “still training,” which includes “chwason,” or sitting meditation, yoga-like exercises as well as “active training,” which includes gymnastics and martial arts.  There is usually “still training” in the morning and “active training” in the evening.

Golgulsa Temple occupies half a mountain and actually contains several temples, administrative building, training hall, several dormitories, dining hall, and so on.

Sunmudo Martial Art 

In recent years Golgulsa Temple has established the Seonmudo Practice Center  to teach this traditional Buddhist martial art.

The formal name of Sunmudo is Bulgyo Geumgang Yeong Gwon.  It is a training method taught at Golgulsa Temple designed to extinguish worldly pains and attain enlightenment. The goal of this training is harmonization of mind and body united with breathing.

Golgulsa temple has run Sunmudo training programs since 1992 for those who would like to experience the traditions of Korean Seon (Zen) Buddhism including Sonmudo.

Tourism 
It also offers temple stay programs where visitors can experience Buddhist culture.

References

External links

 Official site
 Sunmudo

Korean culture
Buddhist temples in South Korea
Buildings and structures in North Gyeongsang Province
Tourist attractions in North Gyeongsang Province
Buddhist caves